Jangipur is a constituency of the Uttar Pradesh Legislative Assembly covering the city of Jangipur in the Ghazipur district of Uttar Pradesh, India.

Jangipur is one of five assembly constituencies in the Ghazipur Lok Sabha constituency. Since 2008, this assembly constituency is numbered 376 amongst 403 constituencies.

Election results

2022

2017
Samajwadi Party candidate Virendra Kumar Yadav won in 2017 Uttar Pradesh Legislative Elections defeating Bharatiya Janta Party candidate Ramesh Narayan Kushwaha by a margin of 3,239 votes. Vidhansabha President of Jangipur Chandrabali Yadav (Fattepur)

References

External links
 

Assembly constituencies of Uttar Pradesh
Politics of Ghazipur district